Nachikurichy  is a village in the Srirangam taluk of Tiruchirappalli district in Tamil Nadu, India.

Demographics 

As per the 2001 census, Nachikurichy had a population of 4,145 with 2,097 males and 2,048 females. The sex ratio was 977 and the literacy rate, 79.17.

References 

 

Villages in Tiruchirappalli district